Nefertiti is a studio album by American jazz musician Miles Davis, released in March 1968. Recorded on June 7, June 22–23 and July 19, 1967, at Columbia's 30th Street Studio, the album was Davis' last fully acoustic album. Davis himself did not contribute any compositions- three were written by tenor saxophonist Wayne Shorter, two by pianist Herbie Hancock and one by drummer Tony Williams.

Music 
The fourth album by Miles Davis's Second Great Quintet, Nefertiti, is best known for the unusual title track, on which the horn section repeats the melody numerous times without individual solos while the rhythm section improvises underneath, reversing the traditional role of a rhythm section. C. Michael Bailey of All About Jazz cited it as one of the quintet's six albums between 1965 and 1968 that introduced the post-bop subgenre.

Shortly after this album, Hancock recorded a different version of "Riot" for his 1968 album Speak Like a Child. In 1978, Shorter recorded a new version of "Pinocchio" with Weather Report for the album Mr. Gone.

This album, along with others by this particular group, demonstrates their willingness to fundamentally alter the basics of a composition during the recording process. For example, the quintet initially rehearsed 'Madness' as a slow waltz. On the next two takes (including the released version) it is rendered at a fast tempo in predominantly 4/4 time. Similarly, Pinocchio is a relatively fast composition on the released version and yet the group rehearsed it at a much slower pace, with the horns repeating the head whilst the rhythm section improvises underneath, in a similar manner to the master take of 'Nefertiti'.

Nefertiti was the final all-acoustic album of Davis' career. Starting with his next album, Miles in the Sky, Davis began to experiment with electric instruments, marking the dawn of his electric period.

Critical reception 
Nefertiti has been received positively by critics. DownBeat writer Howard Mandel said it "seems perched on the cusp" of innovation, with "perfectly pitched" performances and trumpet ideas marked by "cyclical melodies, subdued in mood and sonically bejeweled". However, Mandel lamented the solos for "revert[ing] to regular rhythms", limiting the resulting music from more transcendent possibilities. Robert Christgau considered it among the "great work" Davis recorded with his quintet of the 1960s, although he would later say that "the late-'60[s] Wayne Shorter edition of Miles's band is my least favorite Miles—not that I think it's bad, but I've always found Shorter too cool." Stephen Thomas Erlewine of AllMusic was more enthusiastic about its relatively subtler "charms" while finding it a clear forerunner to the jazz fusion that would follow: "What's impressive, like on all of this quintet's sessions, is the interplay, how the musicians follow an unpredictable path as a unit, turning in music that is always searching, always provocative, and never boring."

Track listing
Columbia – CS 9594

 Sides one and two were combined as tracks 1–6 on CD reissues.

Personnel

Musicians 
 Miles Davis – trumpet
 Wayne Shorter – tenor saxophone
 Herbie Hancock – piano
 Ron Carter – double bass
 Tony Williams – drums

Production
 Teo Macero – production
 Howard Roberts – production
 Fred Plaut, Ray Moore – engineering
 Rob Schwarz – mastering

Chart history 
Billboard Music Charts (North America) – Nefertiti
 1968: Top Jazz Albums – No. 8

References 

1968 albums
Miles Davis albums
Columbia Records albums
Legacy Recordings albums
Albums produced by Teo Macero
Albums recorded at CBS 30th Street Studio
Instrumental albums